Fiorella Gelli Mattheis (born February 10, 1988) is a Brazilian actress, model, television presenter and entrepreneur founder and CEO of the startup Gringa.

Biography 
Fiorella was born in Petrópolis, Rio de Janeiro. She is of Italian and German ancestry, both her paternal and maternal family name are from Northern Italy. She is the daughter of Andreas Mattheis, a race car driver, and Sandra Gelli Mattheis. On July 20, 2013, she married Flávio Canto; they divorced in September 2014.

Career 
Mattheis began her modeling career at the age of fourteen, after being a finalist of a competition held by the agency Elite Model Management. Soon after she moved to São Paulo, and it was from there that her career as a model took off. From fifteen to seventeen, she lived in Japan, Hong Kong and some European countries. Her acting career started when she played Vivian in Malhação.

Mattheis does not consume alcoholic beverages. While she stopped eating red meat and chicken for ideological reasons two years ago, she otherwise avoids stringent dietary restrictions. Instead, she relies on an intense exercise regimen that she began as a teenager: "I run five to seven kilometers three to four times a week. Sometimes on the treadmill, sometimes outdoors." Mattheis has two personal trainers. Mattheis attributes her successful career to achieving what could not be done with beauty alone through "hard work and dedication".

In early June 2015, Mattheis was honored as the godmother of the non-governmental organization Ampara Animal in Rio de Janeiro for her activism in helping needy cats and dogs. Later that month, Mattheis had her hair treated by burning with a lit candle. This technique increases the strength and body with which hair grows, and should only be employed by qualified professionals. In July 2015, she posed in a bikini with fellow Vai Que Cola third season actress Samantha Schmutz.

In August 2015, Mattheis posed in an advertisement for the clothing brand PG with actor and designer Paulo Gustavo. Gustavo described Mattheis as "the most beautiful woman I've ever seen."

Filmography

Television

Film

References

External links 

 
 

1988 births
Living people
Actresses from Petrópolis
Brazilian people of Italian descent
Brazilian television actresses
Brazilian film actresses
Brazilian female models
Brazilian models of German descent